Kitty-Yo is a German record label specializing in quirky pop and electronica. It was founded in 1994 in Berlin by Raik Hölzel following the creation of an independent zine of the same name.  The label began by publishing music for Surrogat, Patrick Wagner's group project, and got the attention of John Peel and Steve Albini.

Since their inception, Kitty-Yo albums and singles have been distributed worldwide, gaining a college radio following in the United States.  Their first charting record was Kante in 2000, and would later release records by artists such as Taylor Savvy, Peaches, Maximilian Hecker, Couch, Chikinki, The Michelles and Raz Ohara.

Kitty-Yo artists

Present 
 Jimi Tenor
 Spyritual
 The Tape vs. RQM
 Litwinenko
 Gold Chains & Sue Cie
 Rhythm King AHF
 White Hole

Past 
 Surrogat
 Laub 
 Peaches
 Gonzales
 Jeans Team
 To Rococo Rot
 Tarwater
 Couch
 Go Plus
 Taylor Savvy
 Wuhling
 Kerosin
 Maximilian Hecker
 MitteKill
 Kante
 Sex in Dallas
 Louie Austen
 Codec & Flexor
 Jahcoozi
 Chikinki
 Rechenzentrum
 Raz Ohara
 Jay Haze

See also
 List of record labels

External links
 Kitty-Yo website
 Discogs Kitty-Yo page
 Feb 2007 TAZ article about Kitty-Yo (in German)

References

German record labels
Record labels established in 1994
Pop record labels
Electronic music record labels